Karnik is an Indian surname. It is mainly found among the members of the Maharashtrian Chandraseniya Kayastha Prabhu (CKP) community. The Karnik are one of 42 families which compose the CKP community. The Karnik's gotra is Bharghav, their god is Surya, and their progenitor was named Karnik.

People with the name Karnik:
 Vijay Karnik , Indian Armed forces 
 Kiran Karnik, Indian administration
 Samir Karnik, Indian film director, producer and screenwriter
 Subodh Karnik, American executive and former CEO of the ATA Airlines
 Gauri Karnik, Indian actress
 Madhu Mangesh Karnik, Indian literary activist
 Ganesh Karnik, Indian politician and Member of Legislative Council at Karnataka Legislative Council
 Sadashiva S. Karnik, professor of molecular medicine at Case Western Reserve University
 Supriya Karnik, Indian actress in Take It Easy and other films
 Capt. Ramkrishna Gangadhar Karnik MBE, Indian Merchant Navy circa 1942 Mumbai-Singapore. For Valiant Ship Escapade was awarded MBE

See also

Karlik (disambiguation)
 17273 Karnik, a main-belt asteroid named after Ryna Karnik, the 2003 Intel International Science and Engineering Fair winner
 Medvedev–Sponheuer–Karnik scale, named after Vít Kárník of Czechoslovakia

Indian surnames
Kayastha